Trad Arr Jones is a tribute album to Nic Jones by British-American folk singer John Wesley Harding. The album consists of Harding's covers of Jones' arrangements of eleven traditional songs, hence the album's title, which is short for "Traditional, Arranged by Jones". It is very different from Harding's previous albums, partly because Harding used to dislike English folk music like Jones'.

Track listing
The Singer's Request	
Little Musgrave	
The Golden Glove	
Annachie Gordon	
The Flandyke Shore	
William And Nancy's Parting	
William Glenn	
The Bonny Bunch Of Roses	
Master Kilby	
Annan Water	
Isle Of France

Personnel
Kurt Bloch –	Bass, Engineer, Guest Artist, Guitar (Electric), Mixing, Producer
Dave Fisher –	Engineer, Mixing
Hammi –	Design
John Wesley Harding –	Guitar (Acoustic), Liner Notes, Mixing, Primary Artist, Vocals
Shelley Jackson –	Paintings, Photography
Nic Jones –	Arranger
Mike Musburger –	Drums
Jason Staczek –	Accordion, Harpsichord, Organ (Hammond), Piano
Paul Stubblebine –	Mastering, Remastering

References

1999 albums
John Wesley Harding (singer) albums
Tribute albums
Covers albums
Zero Hour Records albums